Aspen Technology, Inc., known as AspenTech, is a provider of software and services for the process industries headquartered in Bedford, Massachusetts. AspenTech has 35 offices globally.

History 
Founded in 1981, AspenTech was born out a joint research project between the Massachusetts Institute of Technology (MIT) and US Department of Energy—called the Advanced System for Process Engineering (ASPEN) Project.

On July 15, 2004, AspenTech was required by the Federal Trade Commission to make divestitures in regard to an anti-trust ruling against its acquisition of HyproTech. This included divestment of batch and continuous simulation systems and integrated engineering software business (AXSYS). In the same year, a class action lawsuit was filed against Aspen Technology and its certain officers over issuance of misleading statements and improper revenue recognition.

On November 24, 2004, the company restated results for the fiscal years ended June 2000 through June 2004 after its audit committee discovered the company improperly accounted for certain software licenses.
On March 15, 2005, the company announced that the Audit Committee of the Company's Board of Directors had completed its previously announced financial review and the company had restated its financials for each of the fiscal years ended June 30, 2000 through June 30, 2004. The company's former CEO, David McQuillin, was sentenced in 2007 to 6 months' house arrest and 3 years' probation after pleading guilty to falsifying revenue figures.

Aspen Technology was delisted from the NASDAQ on February 19, 2008 for failing to meet financial transparency guidelines of the NASDAQ exchange. In February 2010 the company was relisted on the NASDAQ exchange.

In July 2019, Aspen Technology signed an agreement to acquire Montreal-based Mnubo Inc.

In September 2020, Aspen Technology has partnered with Wood (Aberdeen, Scotland). The collaboration will allow Aspen's Mtell clients to create foretelling strategies focused on industrial AI and machine learning.

Corporate turnaround 

Under former CEO Mark Fusco, AspenTech executed a corporate turnaround strategy. Examples of steps taken during this period included:

 Consolidating facilities with regional head offices in the Americas, EMEA and Asia Pacific.
 Reducing the R&D facilities from 19 to 3 globally—Process Modeling based in Burlington, Massachusetts; Manufacturing and Supply Chain Center of Excellence in Houston, Texas; Quality Assurance Center in Shanghai, China.
 Reorganizing the professional services business unit—new organization structure and management, and streamlining operations.

On April 30, 2013, AspenTech announced that Mark Fusco would retire as President & CEO effective September 30, 2013. On October 1, 2013, Antonio Pietri became AspenTech President & CEO.

References

External links 
 
 https://www.bostonglobe.com/business/2012/10/01/nashua-expansion-marks-long-comeback-for-aspen-technology/yRKcfeQXDMHNrTDvSmIXJK/story.html (2012)

MES software
Software companies based in Massachusetts
Companies based in Bedford, Massachusetts
Software companies established in 1981
1981 establishments in Massachusetts
Software companies of the United States
1981 establishments in the United States
Companies established in 1981
2022 mergers and acquisitions
Companies listed on the Nasdaq